Miridius longiceps is a species of bug from the Miridae family endemic to France, Portugal and Spain.

References

Insects described in 1955
Hemiptera of Europe
Miridae